Antonio Domenico "Mr. Miggs" Pollina (September 20, 1892 – February 27, 1993) was an Italian-American mobster and former de facto boss of the Philadelphia crime family.

Early life
Antonio Pollina was born in Caccamo, Sicily and became a naturalized American citizen in 1944. His rap sheet dated back to 1927 and included arrests for murder, concealed weapons, untaxed liquor, assault & battery. His legitimate employment was as a cheese salesman for Maggio Cheese Co. Pollina was one of the top leaders of the mafia group known as "The Greaser Gang" and controlled a large loanshark operation.

Boss
In 1959 Pollina was handed the reigns of the family when Joseph Ida fled the United States to avoid an indictment on narcotic charges. Pollina began plotting the murder of Angelo Bruno.

Pollina ordered his Underboss, Ignazio Denaro, to murder Angelo Bruno, but Denaro instead informed Bruno of Pollina's intentions. Bruno used his connections to The Commission to take Pollina's power away from him. The Commission authorized Bruno to murder Pollina. Pollina stepped down and Angelo Bruno replaced him and kept Denaro as his underboss.

Later life
In spite of the alleged murder plot, Pollina remained in Philadelphia and reportedly felt secure enough to ask Angelo Bruno to name him as his consigliere after the death of Joe Rugnetta in 1977. Bruno is said to have declined his request and placed the man who would arrange his death 3 years later instead, Antonio Caponigro. Pollina died of natural causes in 1993. He's buried in Holy Cross Cemetery, Yeadon, Pennsylvania.

References

External links

1892 births
1993 deaths
American centenarians
Men centenarians
American gangsters of Sicilian descent
Philadelphia crime family
American Roman Catholics
Italian emigrants to the United States
People from Caccamo